Maida is a surname. Notable people with the name include:

 Adam Maida (born 1930), American Catholic archbishop and cardinal
 Kevin Maida (born 1992), American lead guitarist for pop punk band Knuckle Puck
 Luisa Maida (born 1979), Salvadoran sport shooter
 Raine Maida (born 1970), Canadian lead singer and primary songwriter of the alternative rock band Our Lady Peace
 John Stuart, Count of Maida (1759–1815), British lieutenant general during the Napoleonic Wars

See also
 Maida (disambiguation)

surnames